American singer and actress Jennifer Hudson has released three studio albums, sixteen singles (including two as a featured artist), five promotional singles and ten music videos. She has also made various contributions to other artist's albums and has appeared on the soundtrack for the 2006 musical film, Dreamgirls.

Hudson's music incorporates a range of musical genres such as soul and R&B. Motown is often seen as an influence on Hudson's music. Hudson rose to fame as a contestant on the third series of American Idol, however being eliminated at the "Top 7" stage. Hudson went on to perform as "Effie White" in the 2006 film adaptation of the original production of Broadway musical, Dreamgirls. Hudson won the Academy Award for Best Supporting Actress for her performance, becoming one of the few people to win an award at the ceremony for a debut performance. The soundtrack of the film was again a huge success, reaching number one on the Billboard 200. One of Hudson's performances, "Love You I Do", was nominated for the 2007 Academy Award for Best Original Song, and won the 2008 Grammy Award for Best Song Written for a Motion Picture, Television or Other Visual Media.

Following Hudson's success on Dreamgirls, her self-titled debut album, Jennifer Hudson was released in 2008, to commercial success, debuting at number two on the Billboard 200. Hudson's first single from the album, "Spotlight" was a success around the world, reaching number 24 on the Billboard Hot 100, as well as 11 on its British counterpart. The song also reached number-one on the Hot R&B/Hip-Hop Songs chart. Jennifer Hudson has since been certified Gold in the U.S. Hudson was nominated for three Grammy Awards for Jennifer Hudson, collecting the award for "Best R&B Album" at the 51st Awards Ceremony. Her second album, I Remember Me (2011), also debuted at number two on the Billboard 200 selling 165,000 copies in its first week. The first single, "Where You At", was an R&B hit, reaching the top ten at the Hot R&B/Hip-Hop Songs.

Studio albums

Soundtracks

Singles

As lead artist

As featured artist

Promotional singles

Other charted songs

Guest appearances

Soundtrack appearances

Music videos

Notes
Charts and sales

References
General

Specific

External links
 
 
 

Discographies of American artists
Rhythm and blues discographies
American Idol discographies
Soul music discographies